Bab Zuweila or Bab Zuwayla is one of three remaining gates in the city wall of the Old City of Cairo, the capital of Egypt. It was also known as Bawabbat al-Mitwali during the Ottoman period. It is considered one of the major landmarks of the city and is the last remaining southern gate from the walls of Fatimid-era Cairo in the 11th and 12th century. 

Its name comes from Bab, meaning "gate", and Zuwayla, as it was the Western Gate of the city that had a trade route for overland travelers with Zuwayla in the Fezzan.

Architecture

The city of Cairo was founded in 969 as the royal city of the Fatimid dynasty. In 1092, the vizier Badr al-Jamali had a second wall built around Cairo. Bab Zuweila was the southern gate in this wall. It has twin towers (minarets) which can be accessed via a steep climb. In earlier times they were used to scout for enemy troops in the surrounding countryside, and in modern times, they provide views of Old Cairo.

The structure also has a platform. Executions would sometimes take place there, and it was also from this location that the Sultan would stand to watch the beginning of the hajj, the annual pilgrimage to Mecca. Sometimes the severed heads of criminals would be displayed along the tops of the walls. This was done as recently as 1811, when the severed heads of Mamluks from the Citadel massacre were mounted on spikes here.

The corresponding gate on the northern side of the city was the Bab al-Futuh, which still stands on the northern side of the Muizz street.

Mamluk era

Bab Zuweila is featured in a major story from the 13th century. In 1260, the Mongol leader Hulagu was attempting to attack Egypt, after he had successfully forced the surrender of Damascus. Hulagu sent six messengers to Qutuz in Cairo, demanding his surrender. The message that was brought was:

Qutuz responded by killing the six envoys, "halving them at the waist," and displaying their heads on Bab Zuweila. He then allied with a fellow Mamluk, Baibars, to defend Islam against the Mongol threat. Their combined forces, perhaps 20,000 strong, marched north to confront the Mongolian army, which was led by Kitbuqa. This clash of the Mamluk and Mongolian armies was known as the Battle of Ain Jalut, and resulted in a resounding Mamluk victory. The battle was pivotal for the region, as it marked the first time that the seemingly unstoppable Mongols suffered defeat. The battle was a turning point in the expansion of their empire, and effectively set their western border, while confirming the Mamluks as the dominant force in the Middle East, and the beginning of the end of the Mongol presence in the area.

Mosque of al-Muayyad

To the west of the Bab Zuwayla had been a dungeon, which once imprisoned Shaykh al-Mahmudi. While still a prisoner, he had vowed that if he were ever released, he would someday destroy the dungeon and build a mosque in its place. He was indeed eventually released, and rose to become Sultan of all Egypt with the regnal name al-Muayyad. True to his word, he razed the old dungeon and built a new mosque on the location in 1415, the Mosque of Sultan al-Muayyad.

Reading the walls

Bab Zuwaila has survived from 1092 to the present by accepting layers added to it or letting go of layers subtracted from its original entity. Layers added during later periods are usually distinguished from earlier ones, while layers removed tend to leave traces. To "read a wall" is to visually detect these differences. Abrupt changes in a wall such as the unexpected use of different materials, different sizes or types or stone, different mortars or different surface renderings are the visual elements among many that constitute the language of "reading walls". The area between Bab Zuweila and Al-Muayyad Mosque has varied and distinct building layers.

Excavations

Excavations undertaken during the course of conversation have added to the understanding of the gate and its surroundings. The following is a list of discoveries made:

 the original floor and ramp system containing re-used inscribed pharaonic blocks from 1092
 the street pavement added by Al-Kamil (1218–1238), whose horse slipped on the original ramp
 the original pivot-shoe-ball bearing system and the granite threshold of the wood door leaves
 remains of shops from the last two centuries and a drinking trough for animals that dates from between 1092 and 1415.

Gallery

See also
 Gates of Cairo
 Bab al-Nasr (Cairo)

Notes

External links 

 

Buildings and structures completed in 1092
Fatimid architecture in Cairo
Muizz Street
Medieval Cairo
Buildings and structures in Cairo
Tourist attractions in Cairo
Gates of Cairo
11th-century establishments in Africa
Fatimid fortifications